Heathrow is a census-designated place and an unincorporated suburban community in Seminole County, Florida, United States. Heathrow is on the I-4 Corridor in Central Florida, 19 miles northeast of Orlando and 38 miles southwest of Daytona Beach. Heathrow comprises a master-planned, private gated residential community of approximately 2,200 homes, and the Heathrow International Business Center, an office park. Heathrow was founded in 1985 by Jeno Paulucci, a food business entrepreneur. The area had been a source of celery used in making his Chun King Foods American Chinese style food. The population was 4,068 at the 2000 census. Heathrow is home to the national headquarters of the American Automobile Association (AAA).

Heathrow is part of the Orlando–Kissimmee–Sanford Metropolitan Statistical Area.

Geography and transportation

The main highway serving Heathrow is Interstate 4, which traverses the state from Daytona Beach in the east to Tampa in the west.

Demographics

As of the census of 2000, there were 4,068 people, 1,770 households, and 1,258 families residing in the CDP. The racial makeup of the CDP was 89.33% White, 3.69% African American, 0.12% Native American, 4.70% Asian, 0.98% from other races, and 1.18% from two or more races. Hispanic or Latino of any race were 6.12% of the population.

There were 1,770 households, out of which 25.1% had children under the age of 18 living with them, 64.9% were married couples living together, 4.2% had a female householder with no husband present, and 28.9% were non-families. 23.5% of all households were made up of individuals, and 4.8% had someone living alone who was 65 years of age or older.  The average household size was 2.30 and the average family size was 2.72.

In the CDP, the population was spread out, with 19.9% under the age of 18, 3.7% from 18 to 24, 32.5% from 25 to 44, 31.8% from 45 to 64, and 12.1% who were 65 years of age or older.  The median age was 41 years. For every 100 females, there were 95.8 males.  For every 100 females age 18 and over, there were 93.0 males.

The median income for a household in the CDP was $84,241, and the median income for a family was $107,479. Males had a median income of $76,790 versus $41,820 for females. The per capita income for the CDP was $59,905.  About 1.4% of families and 2.1% of the population were below the poverty line, including none of those under age 18 and 6.0% of those age 65 or over.

Residential community 
The Heathrow is a city residential community consists of 2061 homes in 30 different sub-developments. All of these sub-developments are part of the Heathrow Master Association. Each sub-development is also incorporated as part of its own Home Owner’s Association, or is part of an association that includes more than one sub-development.

The following neighborhoods are part of the Heathrow residential community.
 Brampton Cove
 Bridgewater Neighborhood
 East Camden
 Bristol Park
 Chestnut Hill
 Clubside
 Devon Green
 The Hamptons
 Heathrow Lakes Maintenance Association
 Brookhaven Manor & Ridge
 Burlington Oaks
 Carrington Park
 Cherry Ridge
 Coventry
 Heron Ridge
 Keenwicke
 Kentford Gardens 
 Lakeside
 Reserve At Heathrow 
 Waters Edge
 Wembley Park
 Wyntree
 Muirfield Village
 Muirfield Village
 Breckenridge Heights
 Lexington Green
 Regency Green
 Regency Green
 Stratford Gardens
 Racquet Club Villas
 Stonebridge
 Turnberry 
 Westover (Bridgewater Club)
 Willowbrook

Notable people 
 Lee Corso, ESPN personality
 Chris DiMarco, professional golfer
 Dwight Howard, professional basketball player
 Cliff Kresge, professional golfer
 Tim Raines, baseball player
 Tim Raines Jr., baseball player

Economy
Heathrow is the national headquarters of the American Automobile Association (AAA).

References

External links
 Heathrow, FL Visitors Guide & Real Estate Guide

Census-designated places in Seminole County, Florida
Greater Orlando
Census-designated places in Florida
Planned communities in Florida
Unincorporated communities in Florida